Colonial wars in Southern Africa may refer to:

 Portuguese Colonial War (1961–1974)
 Angolan War of Independence (1961–1974)
 Mozambican War of Independence (1964–1974)
 Rhodesian Bush War (1964–1979)
 South African Border War (1966–1990)

Portuguese Colonial War
Angolan War of Independence
Mozambican War of Independence
Rhodesian Bush War
South African Border War